The Council of the Assemblies of God of Colombia is a Pentecostal Christian denomination in Colombia. It is affiliated with the World Assemblies of God Fellowship. The headquarters in Bogotá.

History
The Council of the Assemblies of God of Colombia has its origins in a mission of Edward Wagner and his wife, Ada, in 1932. They settled in Sogamoso and established the Sogamoso Evangelical Mission. On April 1, 1932, they celebrated their first Pentecostal worship; the service marked the origin of the Assemblies of God of Colombia. The council was founded in 1958, with 18 missionaries, pastors, workers and delegates all participating in the event.

In the 1960s, the Assemblies of God developed a plan of evangelization campaigns based on Eucharistic celebrations and created its first radio program. In the late 1970s, churches were formed to spread the Gospel and also created regional Bible schools and a National Committee of Bible schools.

On January 13–20, 1975, three districts were created at the XVIII National Assembly in Bogotá: North, Central and West, which were led by a District Presbytery, strengthened corporately to the Assemblies of God. In the 1980s, it held "Invasion 80," which resulted in an increase of 90 churches, 120 preaching points and nearly 21,000 people who attended the meetings.

In 2019, it had 1,204 churches and 356,398 members.

See also
 Assemblies of God

References

External links
 Official Website

colombia
Religious organizations established in 1958
Pentecostal denominations in South America
1958 establishments in Colombia